Daniel John Anthony McCarthy (26 September 1942 – July 2019) was a Welsh professional footballer who played as a winger. He made seven appearances in the Football League for Cardiff City.

References

1942 births
2019 deaths
Welsh footballers
Abergavenny Thursdays F.C. players
Cardiff City F.C. players
Merthyr Tydfil F.C. players
English Football League players
Association football wingers